District coordination officer (DCO) was the administrative head of the newly formed district and city district governments in Pakistan and a senior officer (BS20/21) belonging from the provincial (executive PCS) or federal government service cadre. The officer supervised the affairs of all the public offices and public facilities in the district or a city district for purposes of integrated development, efficient use of public resources and effective service delivery. The officer ensures that the standards set by the government in respect of a public facility are fully observed and supervises and coordinates the implementation of the policies, instructions and guidelines of the government.

Local government reforms (2001 to 2008) and establishment of the office of district coordination officer
Post devolution, local government ordinance PLGO 2001. 
The divisional governments were abolished by President Pervez Musharraf in 2001 and hence the post of divisional commissioner (grade BS20/BS21) were brought to an end.
In 9 divisions of Punjab Province the posts of 9 commissioners were abolished till 2008. The deputy commissioners of the districts were designated as DCOs, i.e district coordination officers, and the post of DCO was upgraded to grade BS21 in the city district governments and to grade BS20 in all other districts from 14th Aug 2001.

Formation of city district governments, district governments 
Much of the powers and functions of provincial and divisional governments were shifted and devolved to the newly formed district and city district governments.  Out of total 36 districts of Punjab Province, only five metropolis were given the status of city districts. Initially, the existing Commissioners were posted as DCO in the city districts. In Sindh province, five districts of Karachi division were abolished and a single city district government Karachi was formed. Divisional Commissioner Karachi was appointed as first DCO Karachi. Each district was empowered to make own policies and developmental budgets via newly formed District Assemblies.

District governments were formed in total 150 districts of Pakistan, out of which only eight were city district governments (CDG);

Functions and powers 

DCO was the head of district governments. DCOs had similar administrative powers and duties which deputy commissioner and commissioners used to have. DCO was the principal accounting officer of the district and answerable to the provincial assembly public accounts committee. However, the land revenue appellate powers of the commissioner were decentralized/devolved from division to district and were handed over to the newly created post of executive district officer (revenue) and district land collector power of deputy commissioners were handed over to the new post of district officer (revenue). Subsequently, the power of assistant commissioner/assistant collector was handed over to the deputy district officer (revenue). The EDO(revenue) grade BS19, DO(revenue) BS18 and DDO(revenue) BS17 were the same officers of provincial or federal civil services i.e PMS/PCS or CSP/DMG/PAS. 

In absence of DCO, EDO (revenue) used to hold acting charge of DCO.
DCO was the in charge of all departments/group of offices of the district including revenue, finance and planning, health, education, literacy, information technology, agriculture & livestock, works & services, forests, community development, municipal services etc. All these departments/group of offices were headed by respective EDOs who than reported to the DCO. DCOs and Revenue officials were entrusted with the magisterial powers also from time to time. DCO was directly reporting to the Chief Secretary of the province for administrative matters and chief minister. whereas in their district the policy making was done in consultation with the district nazim/Mmayor, who was an elected representative and the chief executive of the district.

Restoration of the divisional governments and office of divisional commissioners 

In 2008, after the presidency of Pervez Musharraf, provincial governments of Pakistan again established the third tier of government i.e divisional governments through constitutional amendments and the post of divisional commissioner (BS20/BS21) was again initiated.  Divisional commissioners report directly to the Chief Secretary of the province.

Restoration of the office of Deputy Commissioner 
Soon after appointment of Divisional Commissioners, junior officers were posted as DCO and they started working under supervision of Divisional commissioners, later on the post was officially downgraded to BS19 as before 2001. Though the District Nazim/Mayors initially resisted this change but to no avail and the local governments were made dysfunctional.  In 2011 and 2017, the term DCO was also re named as Deputy Commissioner in Sindh and Punjab province respectively

The appellate powers of land revenue are now again with the Divisional Commissioner and the post of EDO(revenue) is abolished. 
The post of deputy commissioner has now the powers of land collector as before thus post of District Officer (Revenue) is also abolished. Deputy District officer (Revenue) is now the assistant commissioner.

Responsibilities
District are now under control of deputy commissioners, who are responsible for law and order, collection of revenue, developmental program coordination and common welfare of people in their respective districts.

List of district coordination officers
Following are the names of district coordination officers who served in post devolution era during 2001 to 2008 in Pakistan :

Punjab Province

Baluchistan Province

References

Government of Shaukat Aziz